Gyeongmun of Silla (846–875) (r. 861–875) was the 48th ruler of the Korean kingdom of Silla.  He was the grandson of King Huigang, and the son of the ichan Gim Gye-myeong.  His mother was Lady Gwanghwa, the daughter of King Sinmu.  Gyeongmun married Queen Munui, who was the daughter of King Heonan.

Gyeongmun's reign saw intensifying internal strife and rebellion.  He sought to strengthen the kingdom within and without, but was generally unsuccessful.  Famine was widespread.  In 869, he sent the Crown Prince (who would become King Heongang) to Tang China together with Gim Yun.

The Samguk Yusa tells that Gyeongmun became a Hwarang with 18 years.

The Samguk Yusa also portrays a story which is similar to that of King Midas' ears. A royal crownmaker appears instead of the barber. The crownmaker shouted the secret at a bamboo forest. Following the crownmaker's death, the king noticed that when the wind blows, his secrets echo from the forest. He immediately felt unpleasant and destroyed the bamboo forest and planted dogwoods.

His daughter, Jinseong, would later become Silla's 51 ruler and its 3rd and last reigning queen in 887.

Family
Queen Munui of the Gim clan (문의왕후 김씨), eldest daughter of King Heonan
Son: Heongang of Silla (c.861–886)
Daughter: Jinseong of Silla
Madam Jeonhwa (정화부인), second daughter of King Heonan
Son: Jeonggang of Silla (c.863–887)

See also
 King Gyeongmun's ear tale
 List of Korean monarchs
 List of Silla people
 Unified Silla

References

Silla rulers
846 births
875 deaths
9th-century births
9th-century rulers in Asia